Get Retarded may refer to:

"Get Retarded", a song by Bassi Maestro from the album Tutti a casa
"Get Retarded", a song by Canibus from the album Can-I-Bus
"Get Retarded", a song by DJ Kay Slay from the album The Streetsweeper, Vol. 2
"Get Retarded", a song by Craig Mack (released as MC EZ)

See also
"Let's Get Retarded", a song by the Black Eyed Peas from the album Elephunk
Retardation (disambiguation)